is a Japanese voice actress who previously worked for Aoni Production. She is best known as the voices of the various Panther Claw villains in Cutie Honey, and the Hell Tree in the first arc of the Sailor Moon R series. She also voiced Chris MacNeil in the original Japanese dub of The Exorcist.

Filmography

Television animation
GeGeGe no Kitarō (1971) as Hone-onna
Cutie Honey (1973) as Tomohawk Panther, Ironsado
Alps no Shōjo Heidi (1974) as Mrs. Dete
Vicke Viking (1974) as Irba
Dog of Flanders (1975) as Ellina Cogez
Candy Candy (1976) as Sister Pony, Grandaunt Elory, Narrator
Galaxy Express 999 (1978) as Narrator
Akai Tori (1979) as Narrator
King Arthur (1979) as Yulliens, Ashura
Little Women (1981) as Narrator
Galactic Gale Baxingar (1982) as Erika Tena
Glass Mask (1984) as Chigusa Tsukikage
Princess Sarah (1985) as Miss Minchin
Little Women (1987) as Mary "Marmee" March
Kiteretsu Daihyakka (1991) as Aiko
Sailor Moon R (1993) as Hell Tree
Emma - A Victorian Romance (2005) as Kelly Stowner
Emma - A Victorian Romance: Second Act (2007) as Kelly Stowner

OVA
2001 Nights (1987) as the narrator
Sohryuden: Legend of the Dragon Kings (1993) as Xi Wangmu
Master Keaton (1998) as Sachiko Shiratori

Movies
Ringing Bell (1978) as Chirin's Mother
Swan Lake (1981) as Queen
The Wizard of Oz (1982) as Aunt Em and Servant
Papa Mama Bye bye (1984) as Aunt
Penguin's Memory: Shiawase Monogatari (1985) as Helen
The Five Star Stories (1989) as Narrator

Video games
Clock Tower II: The Struggle Within (1998) as Yayoi Takano, Atsumi Kishi

Dubbing
The Andromeda Strain (1974 TV Asahi edition) as Dr. Ruth Leavitt (Kate Reid)
Ben-Hur (1981 TV Asahi edition) as Miriam (Martha Scott)
Cocoon (1988 TV Asahi edition) as Bess McCarthy (Gwen Verdon)
Death Wish (1980 TV Asahi edition) as Joanna Kersey (Hope Lange)
The Diary of Anne Frank as Petronella Van Daan (Shelley Winters)
The Exorcist (1980 TBS edition) as Chris MacNeil (Ellen Burstyn)
The Good Son as Alice Davenport (Jacqueline Brookes)
The Miracle Worker (1975 TV Asahi edition) as Anne Sullivan (Anne Bancroft)
The Sound of Music as Mother Abbess (Peggy Wood)
Star Wars Episode IV: A New Hope (1985 NTV edition) as Beru Lars (Shelagh Fraser)

References

External links

 

1931 births
Hibakusha
Living people
Voice actresses from Hiroshima Prefecture
Japanese voice actresses
20th-century Japanese actresses
21st-century Japanese actresses
Aoni Production voice actors